The 2020–21 Israeli Premier League, also known as Ligat Tel Aviv Stock Exchange for sponsorship reasons, was the 22nd season since its introduction in 1999 and the 79th season of top-tier football in Israel. The season began on 22 August 2020 and concluded on 30 May 2021.

Teams
A total of fourteen teams were competing in the league, including twelve sides from the 2019–20 season and two promoted teams from the 2019–20 Liga Leumit.

Maccabi Petah Tikva were promoted as the winners of the 2019–20 Liga Leumit. Bnei Sakhnin were promoted as the Runner-ups of the 2019–20 Liga Leumit. The two teams returned just one year after their relegation.

Hapoel Ra'anana and Sektzia Nes Tziona were relegated to the 2020–21 Liga Leumit after finishing the 2019–20 Israeli Premier League in the bottom two places.

Stadiums and locations

Personnel and sponsorship

Foreign players
The number of foreign players were restricted to six per team, while only five could have been registered to a game.

In bold: Players that have been capped for their national team.

Managerial changes

Regular season

Regular season table

Regular season results

Results by round

Positions by round
The table lists the positions of teams after each week of matches. To preserve chronological evolvements, any postponed matches are not included in the round at which they were originally scheduled, but added to the full round they were played immediately afterwards. For example, if a match is scheduled for round 13, but then postponed and played between rounds 16 and 17, it will be added to the standings for round 16.

Championship round
Key numbers for pairing determination (number marks position after 26 games)

Championship round table

Results by round
The table lists the results of teams in each round.

Positions by round

Relegation round
Key numbers for pairing determination (number marks position after 26 games)

Due to 2 teams that play in the Bloomfield Stadium qualified to this round, and in order to insure that all the last games of this round, can be played in the same time (for purity reasons), the order of the games, has been changed, affecting fixtures 29, 30, 32 and 33.

Relegation round table

Results by round

Positions by round

Season statistics

Top scorers

Source:

Top Assists

Source:

Hat-tricks

References

Israeli Premier League seasons
2020–21 in Israeli football
2020–21 in Israeli football leagues
Israel